Aaron Troy Ernest (born November 8, 1993) is an American sprinter who specializes in the  100 meters and 200 metres. He went to Homewood high school and competed for the LSU Tigers from 2012 to 2015.

A native of Baton Rouge, Louisiana, Ernest relocated to Alabama where he attended Homewood High School. He was an All-USA high school Track and Field team selection by USA Today in 2011. His 2011 season bests in 100 m (10.17s) and 200 m (20.86 s).

At the 85th Texas Relays in March 2012, Ernest placed first in the 100 metres in the university group, behind only Jeff Demps of the University of Florida. Classified as a junior athlete for the 2012 season, Ernest is eligible for the 2012 World Junior Championships in Athletics. His 100 m season best of 10.15 seconds was second among juniors in the 2012 season, behind only Adam Gemili.

Also a standout wide receiver at Homewood High School, Ernest received numerous football scholarship offers, including Kentucky, Louisiana Tech, Southern Miss, UAB, and Wake Forest. Ernest then went on to attend Rookie Minicamp for the Seattle Seahawks in 2018.

Competition record

References

External links

DyeStat profile for Aaron Ernest
Scout.com profile for Aaron Ernest
LSU Tigers bio

1993 births
Living people
Track and field athletes from New Orleans
American male sprinters
LSU Tigers track and field athletes
People from Homewood, Alabama